Betzet is a moshav in the Western Galilee in northern Israel. Located near Shlomi and Nahariya,  it falls under the jurisdiction of Mateh Asher Regional Council.

History

Antiquity

Betzet is known in historical records as  one of several places along the route to Tyre where produce transported from the Land of Israel was often sold in the local marketplaces, mentioned as such in the Tosefta (Shevi'it 4:8-ff.) and in the 3rd century Mosaic of Rehob. Betzet is listed in the Tosefta and the Jerusalem Talmud as subject to the laws of Shmita.

State of Israel

Moshav Betzet was founded in 1951 on land belonging to the Palestinian village al-Bassa, which was depopulated during the 1948 Arab–Israeli War. The founders were immigrants to Israel from the Balkan states, especially Yugoslavia and Romania. The community retains the name of the ancient village of Betzet, which is estimated to have existed nearby. 

On 12 August 1968, two Syrian MiG-17F aircraft landed at Betzet by mistake. The aircraft would go on to serve in the US Defense Intelligence Agency project HAVE DRILL.

Landmarks
Tel Betzet (Tel means "hill" or "archaeological site") is located south of the village.  It has pottery vessels from the Copper Age and the middle Canaanite period.  Likewise wine-pressing holes and graves from the Roman and Byzantine imperial eras are preserved.

Betzet Aerodrome, a disused World War II British aerodrome, is located to the west of Betzet. A helipad has been built on the north-western part of the runway by the Israeli Air Force. There are numerous derelict structures from the British era on site; they include AA gun mounts, hardened aircraft shelters, and hangars. The aerodrome grounds are used today as agricultural land and contain banana, olive and pomegranate groves. The Israeli Air Force uses the helipad occasionally and the local radio control flying model club has its activity on the helipad on weekends.

Economy
The area is about 2,200 dunams. Most of the residents work in farming bananas, avocadoes and turkeys.

References

External links

Betzet Authority for Development of the Galilee 

Moshavim
Populated places in Northern District (Israel)
Yugoslav Jews
1951 establishments in Israel
Populated places established in 1951
Ancient Jewish settlements of Galilee
Romanian-Jewish culture in Israel
Yugoslav-Jewish culture in Israel